Bononia, once the residential episcopal see of the city of that name, is a titular see of the Catholic Church.

History 
The city of Bononia lay within the ancient Roman province of Dacia Ripensis. Under its present name of Vidin, it is part of Bulgaria.

It was important enough to become a suffragan bishopric of the Metropolitan Archbishop of the provincial capital Raziaria.
The Latin adjective by which the diocese is referred to is Bononiensis.

Titular see 
The diocese was nominally restored in 1933 as Latin Catholic titular bishopric of Bononia (Latin = Curiate Italian) / Bononien(sis) (Latin adjective).

It has had the following incumbents, so far of the fitting Episcopal (lowest) rank :
 Antoine Caillot (12 December 1961 – 24 March 1964) as Coadjutor Bishop of Évreux (France) (1961.12.12 – 1964.03.24); next succeeded as Bishop of Évreux (1964.03.24 – retired 1972.04.12), died 1994
 John Burke (born Ireland) (3 August 1966 – death 24 July 1970) as emeritate; previously Apostolic Administrator of Archdiocese of Delhi and Simla (India) (1950 – 1951.04.12), only Bishop of (newly split-off) Simla (India) (1959.06.04 – 1964.05.12), (see) restyled 'first' Bishop of Simla and Chandigarh (India) (1964.05.12 – retired 1966.08.03)
 José Julio Aguilar García (5 December 1970 – 2 November 1972) as Bishop-Prelate of Territorial Prelature of Escuintla (in his native Guatemala) (1969.05.09 – 1972.11.02); later Bishop of Santa Cruz de la Sierra (Bolivia) (1972.11.02 – retired 1974.08.22), died 1999
 Pablo Antonio Vega Mantilla (30 January 1973 – 30 April 1991) as last Bishop-Prelate of Territorial Prelature of Juigalpa (Nicaragua) (1970.11.16 – 1991.04.30), President of Episcopal Conference of Nicaragua (1983 – 1985); (see) promoted first Bishop of Juigalpa (Nicaragua) (1991.04.30 – 1993.10.29), died 2007
 James Moriarty (26 June 1991 – 4 June 2002) as Auxiliary Bishop of Archdiocese of Dublin (Ireland) (1991.06.26 – 2002.06.04); later Bishop of Kildare and Leighlin (Ireland) (2002.06.04 – retired 2010.04.22)
 Milan Šášik, Vincentians (C.M.) (born Slovakia) (12 November 2002 – 17 March 2010) as Apostolic Administrator of Mukacheve of the Ruthenians (Ukraine) (2002.11.12 – 2010.03.17); next succeeded as Eparch (Eastern Catholic Bishop) of Mukacheve of the Ruthenians ((2010.03.17 – ...)
 John J. McIntyre (8 June 2010 – ...), as Auxiliary Bishop of Archdiocese of Philadelphia (US) (2010.06.08 – ...).

References

Sources and external links 
 GCatholic with titular incumbent biography links
 Bibliography - ecclesiastical history
 lemma 'Bononia', in Dictionnaire d'Histoire et de Géographie ecclésiastiques, vol. IX, Paris 1937, coll. 1089-1090

Christian organizations established in 1961
Catholic titular sees in Europe
Suppressed Roman Catholic dioceses
Culture in Vidin
History of Vidin